Erie BayHawks may refer to:

Erie BayHawks (2008–2017) – basketball team in the NBA Development League that relocated as the Lakeland Magic
Erie BayHawks (2017–2019) – basketball team in the NBA G League that relocated as the College Park Skyhawks
Erie BayHawks (2019–2021) – basketball team in the NBA G League that relocated as the Birmingham Squadron